Gymnocoronis is a genus of flowering plants in the family Asteraceae.

 Species
 Gymnocoronis latifolia Hook. & Arn. - Guatemala, Mexico (from Tamaulipas to Chiapas)
 Gymnocoronis matudae R.M.King & H.Rob. - Campeche
 Gymnocoronis sessilis S.F.Blake - Tabasco, Chiapas, Veracruz, Jalisco, Guatemala
 Gymnocoronis spilanthoides (D.Don ex Hook. & Arn.) DC. - Brazil, Peru, Bolivia, Paraguay, Uruguay, Argentina; naturalized in Australia, New Zealand, China

References

Asteraceae genera
Eupatorieae